Maceió/Zumbi dos Palmares International Airport , formerly called Campo dos Palmares Airport, is the airport serving Maceió, Brazil. Since 16 December 1999 the airport is named after Zumbi dos Palmares (1645–1695) one of the pioneers of resistance to slavery in Brazil.

The airport is operated by AENA.

History
The airport complex underwent major renovation in 2005, in which the passenger terminal and apron were renovated and the runway was extended.

Previously operated by Infraero, on March 15, 2019 AENA won a 30-year concession to operate the airport.

Airlines and destinations

Notes
 TAP Air Portugal's flights operate from Maceió to Lisbon via Natal. However, the airline does not have cabotage rights to transport passengers solely between Maceió and Natal.

Access

See also

List of airports in Brazil

References

External links

Airports in Alagoas
Maceió